The Nagatogawa Formation is a Mesozoic geologic formation in Japan. Fossil ornithopod tracks have been reported from the formation.

See also

 List of dinosaur-bearing rock formations
 List of stratigraphic units with ornithischian tracks
 Ornithopod tracks

Footnotes

References
 Weishampel, David B.; Dodson, Peter; and Osmólska, Halszka (eds.): The Dinosauria, 2nd, Berkeley: University of California Press. 861 pp. .

Mesozoic Erathem of Asia